Udea secernalis is a moth in the family Crambidae. It was described by Heinrich Benno Möschler in 1890. It is found in Puerto Rico, Jamaica and on Hispaniola.

References

secernalis
Moths described in 1890